The International Sahaja Public School in Dharamsala, India is a school run by the Sahaja Yoga movement. The school was founded in 1990.

Overview

The school is located in the Himalayas, above Dharamsala in the Kangra district, near McLeod Ganj, at an altitude of more than 1700m. Children coming to the school must have previously been brought up in Sahaja Yoga culture and understand the importance of meditation. Their education is based on the teachings of Nirmala Srivastava. Students "learn the basic principles of Sahaja Yoga ... the tenets of Hinduism and worship the school’s patron".

The medium of instruction is English. Subjects (as followed by the Indian Certificate of Secondary Education curriculum) include standard courses as well as English, German, Indian Classical Music (including instruments), and Indian Classical dance.

Mixed views

Judith Coney reports that the school has accepted children from the age of four and notes that "often very young children are separated from their natural parents for prolonged periods, as they usually stay in India for nine months". An Indian newspaper article published in 2000 reported that students at the time were aged six and above.

An official school statement said that the villagers bring presents to the students and enjoy looking after them. A 1995 report on the school by the Austrian Ministry of Justice has said that uninvited visitors 'dropping in' have been refused entry

A 2000 article in the Indian Express noted that "an aura of secrecy envelops the school and entry is strictly forbidden." The article quoted a director of the school as saying "...we don’t like the vibrations to be polluted by outsiders. Sometimes we even tell parents not to come here." Students are schooled in 'vibratory awareness' which practitioners say enables them to detect and treat subtle imbalances in themselves and others. This is part of the school's vision of fulfilling the students' physical, emotional, intellectual and, above all, spiritual potential.

According to the school website, Sahaja Yoga education "envisages the development of the child in an atmosphere where the innate qualities, such as innocence and wisdom, are protected and enhanced; where the students imbibe the timeless and unchanging values which come from inner awareness, and are not subject to the vagaries of fashion, religion or national culture." The Indian Express article noted that the "dormitories are austere, even monastic in appearance".

They are realised souls, there is God who is looking after them, why are you so much worried about them? Leave them alone! Send them to the Indian school. Then the mothers are sitting there, teachers don't like it, no one likes it. They are just gone there. The mothers. No school allows such nonsense! But in Sahaja Yoga they think they have the right. What right have they got? Have they paid for the school? Have they done anything for the school? What right have they got to go and sit in the school? So the discretion should be, we have to bring up our children according to Sahaj culture. The first of the principles of Sahaja Yoga is fortitude. Sahaja Yoga is not meant for such .... dainty darlings. You have to be soldiers of Sahaja Yoga. - Nirmala Srivastava

The Austrian Ministry of Justice's 1995 Report on the Sahaja Yoga school comments that "Despite the altitude, eight months of sunshine a year and outdoor activities and sports in the open, the European children appeared pale which was unexplainable to the visitor". Coney reports that one child arrived home having lost a stone in weight, and so changed in appearance that his mother could not recognise him, although the school had consistently reported that he was 'doing fine'.

Coney reports that, "whilst there is evidence that some children have enjoyed their time at the Sahaja Yoga school in India, a number of children have expressed unhappiness at being returned to the India school." The school advises parents not to enroll their children until they are ready.

Regarding discipline, Sukhmani writes that corporal punishment is taboo at the school. Nirmala Srivastava has advised that parents are allowed to occasionally slap 'extremely difficult' children, but forbids teachers from slapping children or punishing "in such a way that the child gets hurt." Coney reports that due to instances of children having been beaten, the Headmaster was temporarily dismissed. The Supreme Court of India banned corporal punishment in schools in 2000.

With thorough investigation of this subject, the students' reviews have been proven to be trustworthy and this school remains one of the best places for a child's spiritual, physical and emotional growth.

Attitudes of grandparents

There have been instances of objections by grandparents of children at the school which have resulted in legal action being taken. In Austria, a mother's guardianship was partly substituted, after legal intervention of the grandmother, as she was not willing to take her boy out of the Sahaja Yoga boarding-school in India. A French Court of Appeal allowed another mother custody of her children on condition that she did not send any of them to the school, again a result of grandparental intervention.

Coney says these instances are confined to the European continent partly because the anti cult movement there has successfully drawn attention to the differences between Sahaja Yoga and the mainstream, resulting in a media attack on the movement. Coney says in the UK grandparents have been more likely to give parents freedom to bring up children as they wish, in a couple of instances even paying for the child's education at the school. The enrolment form used in the admission procedure now asks for details of any resistance from family members to the child studying at the school.

References

External links

Official ISPS website

International schools in India
Schools in Kangra district
Sahaja Yoga
Educational institutions established in 1990
1990 establishments in Himachal Pradesh